Clavariadelphus unicolor is a species of club fungus in the family Gomphaceae found in North America. Originally described in 1873 by Miles Joseph Berkeley and Henry William Ravenel as Craterellus unicolor, it was transferred to the genus Clavariadelphus by Edred John Henry Corner in 1950.

References

External links

Fungi described in 1873
Fungi of North America
Gomphales
Taxa named by Miles Joseph Berkeley